Hispanos (from  relating to Spain, from ) are Hispanic residents of the United States who are culturally descended from the original Spanish-speaking settlers in the areas which were once part of New Spain and later independent Mexico. They may be variously of Spanish/Criollo Spanish, mestizo, or Indigenous origin. Residing in what is today the Southwestern United States, they have retained a predominantly Hispanic culture, having lived in that region since it was ceded from Mexico to the United States following the Mexican–American War. 

The term Hispano is used to compensate for flawed U.S. Census practices in the 1930s which categorized people of the American Southwest as recent immigrants rather than centuries-long inhabitants of the Spanish and Mexican territories Alta California (modern California), Santa Fe de Nuevo México (modern New Mexico), and Tejas (modern Texas).

Their total population in the American Southwest is around 1.8 million and the largest of these groups, numbering around 750,000, are the Hispanos of New Mexico, originating in Spanish and Mexican Santa Fe de Nuevo México, they have left a large impact on New Mexico's culture, cuisine, and music.

Description 
Though the word Hispano in Spanish could describe anyone of Spanish ancestry, when used in American English, the term specifically refers to those who have lived in the Southwestern United States for centuries, who did not cross any border into the United States, but rather came under U.S. rule due to the country's territorial expansion. They have lived in the region from the time that it constituted the northernmost part of the Viceroyalty of New Spain. This entity largely gained independence as part of the  First Mexican Empire. Later, the northernmost parts of republican Mexico became a part of the United States of America in the wake of its Texas annexation and the Mexican–American War.

Hispanos are mostly descendants of Spanish (various regional ethnic groups from Spain including Castilians, Andalusians, Extremeños, Galicians, Catalans, Basques and also Sephardic Jewish-origin Conversos who converted to Christianity to escape persecution from the Spanish Inquisition) and Mexican (of Spanish, other hispanicized European Mexican, Mestizo, and/or indigenous Mexican ancestry) settlers who arrived during the Spanish colonial period and the Mexican period. 

Many, but not all, Hispanos differentiate themselves culturally from the population of Mexican Americans and Spanish Americans whose ancestors arrived in the Southwest after the Mexican Revolution in 1910.

History
As the United States expanded westward, it annexed lands with a long-established population of Spanish-speaking settlers. Prior to incorporation into the United States (and briefly, into Independent Texas), Hispanos had enjoyed a privileged status in the society of New Spain, and later in post-colonial Mexico.

Regional subgroups of Hispanos were named for their geographic location in the so-called "internal provinces" of New Spain:
 Californios in Spanish California (Las Californias), and later Mexican (Upper) California (Alta California)
 Neomexicanos in Spanish New Mexico, and later Mexican New Mexico (Nuevo México)
 Tejanos in Spanish Texas, and later Mexican Texas (Tejas)

Another group of Hispanos, the Isleños ("Islanders"), are named after their geographic origin in the Old World, viz. the Canary Islands. In the US today, this group is primarily associated with the state of Louisiana.

Demography 
Hispano populations include Californios in California, Arizona and Nevada, along with Utah and southwestern Wyoming, which had no Hispano communities, and western Colorado, that had no Californio communities; Neomexicanos in New Mexico and Colorado; Tejanos in Texas; Isleños in Louisiana and Texas; and Adaeseños (of Canarian, Mexican and Amerindian descent) in northwestern Louisiana. While generally integrated into mainstream American societies, Hispanos have retained much of their colonial culture, and have also absorbed several American Indian and Cajun traditions. Many Hispanos also identify with later waves of Mexican immigrants that arrived after these lands became part of the US.

Many Hispanos, particularly those of younger generations, identify more with the mainstream population and may understand little or no Spanish. Most of them are Roman Catholic Christians. Several linguists and folklorists have studied the culture and language of some of the Hispanic communities, including Samuel G. Armistead, who studied the Isleño communities of Louisiana, and Juan Bautista Rael, who studied the Neomexicano communities.

  Californios: between 300,000 and 500,000 (estimates by Alexander V. King in 2004)
   Neomexicanos: More than 750,000
  Tejanos: Unknown

Notable people

See also
Floridanos
Juan Bautista Rael
White Hispanic Americans
Criollo people
Spanish American
Hispanics

References

 
 Hispanos